ARA San Juan (S-42) was a  diesel-electric submarine in service with the Submarine Force of the Argentine Navy from 1986 to 2017. It was built in West Germany, entering service on 19 November 1985, and underwent a mid-life update from 2008 to 2013.

On 15 November 2017, San Juan went missing with 44 crewmen during a routine patrol in the South Atlantic off the coast of Argentina, believed to have suffered an electrical malfunction, and a multi-nation search operation was mounted. Within hours of San Juans last transmission, an acoustic anomaly consistent with an implosion was detected in the vicinity of the vessel's last known location. On 30 November, the search and rescue operation was abandoned.

Design 

Built by Thyssen Nordseewerke, San Juan was laid down on 18 March 1982 and launched on 20 June 1983. It had a single-hull design, with a lightweight bow and stern and a watertight superstructure in the central part. Its sister vessel, is the only other one of its type, though the program originally sought to produce a larger number of submarines.

Name 
The submarine's name derives from the province of San Juan; the names of all Argentine submarines begin with the letter S. Past ships with the same name are a destroyer (1911), a surveyor (1929), and a torpedo boat (1937).

The prefix ARA is the acronym of the Argentine Navy in Spanish.

Operational history 
The submarine entered service on 18 November 1985.

In 1994, during the FleetEx 2/94 "George Washington" exercise with the United States Navy, San Juan avoided detection by United States anti-submarine forces for the entire duration of the war game, penetrating the destroyer defense and "sinking" the command ship . The submarine took part in other exercises including Gringo-Gaucho and UNITAS.

The vessel underwent a mid-life update between 2008 and 2013, taking longer than expected due to budget constraints. The upgrade cost around 100 million pesos (US$12.4 million) and comprised more than 500,000 work hours during which the submarine was cut in half and had its four MTU engines and batteries replaced. The updates were carried out at the Argentine Industrial Naval Complex's (CINAR) Tandanor and Storni shipyards, in the southern sector of Buenos Aires port. Later, San Juan was tasked with carrying out surveillance exercises in the exclusive economic zone around Puerto Madryn, particularly in the role of combating illegal fishing.

Disappearance 

There were 44 servicemen on board the missing submarine, including Argentina's first female submarine officer, Eliana Krawczyk. The submarine carried oxygen for no more than seven days when submerged.

Search
The search and rescue operation was carried out under the auspices of the International Submarine Escape and Rescue Liaison Office, an organisation of over 40 countries set up in 2003 following the Kursk submarine disaster. Search efforts continued several days, without success.

The Argentine ambassador in Austria, Rafael Grossi, an expert in security, disarmament and nuclear non-proliferation issues, proposed the use of an international hydrophones network, owned by the Preparatory Commission for the Comprehensive Nuclear-Test-Ban Treaty Organization, to seek information about the vessel's fate. He convinced Lassina Zerbo, CTBTO executive director, to search the organization's records, looking for anomalies.

By 24 November, the search and rescue operation involved more than 30 aircraft and ships from Argentina, the United Kingdom, Brazil, the United States, Chile and other countries. More than 4,000 personnel from 13 countries assisted the search, scouring an area the size of Spain.

On 27 November, a press release revealed that according to the submarine's last report from 15 November, San Juans snorkel had leaked water into the forward storage batteries the day before, which ignited a fire. After extinguishing the fire, the crew disconnected the forward batteries. The submarine continued onward, powered by the aft batteries.

On 30 November, 15 days after San Juan went missing, the Navy declared that the rescue phase of the operation was over, and the search for the submarine on the seabed would be continuing. The loss of 44 crewmen constituted the largest loss of life aboard a submarine since the  malfunctioned in April 2003, until being surpassed by the loss of 53 crewmen aboard the Indonesian submarine KRI Nanggala in April 2021. A criminal investigation was launched into the disappearance.

Wreck discovery 

It had been considered that the probability of locating the wreck in the area where it was eventually found was 90%, but previous searches failed to find it due to insufficient technology and presence of numerous submarine canyons. Photographs were released showing the shattered remains of the submarine broken up on the seabed. Ocean Infinity will receive a reward of US$7.5 million for finding the missing vessel. Argentine Navy spokesman Captain Jorge Balbi presented close-up photos of the wreck in a press briefing.

Commemoration
On 24 October 2021 a monument commemorating the 44 crew members lost was unveiled in front of the Mar del Plata Naval Base.

See also 

 List of ships of the Argentine Navy
 List of submarines of Submarine Force Command
 List of submarine incidents since 2000

References

Further reading

External links 

 Submarine Shipyard Nordseewerke official site 
 
 
"Así quedó el ARA San Juan sumergido en el océano Atlántico" (in Spanish). LA NACIÓN.

1983 ships
Maritime incidents in 2017
Ships built in Emden
TR-1700-class submarines
Lost submarines of Argentina
Shipwrecks of the Argentine coast
Mar del Plata
Warships lost with all hands